1st Infantry is the debut solo studio album by American hip hop producer and recording artist The Alchemist. The album was released on September 21, 2004 and peaked at number 101 on the Billboard 200 and number 11 on the Top R&B/Hip-Hop Albums chart.

The album was solely produced by The Alchemist and features guest vocalists including Prodigy, Nina Sky, The Game, The Lox, Nas, M.O.P., Mobb Deep, Lloyd Banks, T.I., and Dilated Peoples.

One single from the album, "Hold You Down", peaked at number 95 on the Billboard Hot 100 and number 47 on the Hot R&B/Hip-Hop Singles & Tracks chart.

The album was also released in an instrumental version and deluxe edition with a bonus DVD on October 4, 2005.

The song "Bangers" appeared in Saints Row.

Track listing 
All tracks produced by the Alchemist.

Chart history

References

2004 debut albums
Albums produced by the Alchemist (musician)
The Alchemist (musician) albums
E1 Music albums